General elections were held in Liberia in 1887. In the presidential election, the result was a victory for incumbent Hilary R. W. Johnson of the True Whig Party, who was re-elected for a third term.

References

Liberia
1887 in Liberia
Elections in Liberia
One-party elections
Election and referendum articles with incomplete results